The 2020–21 LPGA of Japan Tour was the 53rd season of the LPGA of Japan Tour, the professional golf tour for women operated by the Japan Ladies Professional Golfers′ Association. Because of the COVID-19 pandemic, the 2020 season was combined with the 2021 season. Only 14 of the original 37 events were played in 2020.

Leading money winner was Mone Inami with 255,192,049 ¥. She also finished most often (25 times) inside the top ten. Ayaka Furue won the tour's Mercedes Ranking.

Schedule
The number in parentheses after winners' names shows the player's total number wins in official money individual events on the LPGA of Japan Tour, including that event.

Events in bold are majors.
The Toto Japan Classic is co-sanctioned with the LPGA Tour.

References

External links

2020–21
2020 in women's golf
2021 in women's golf
2020 in Japanese sport
2021 in Japanese sport